George M.S. Schulz (February 17, 1871 – April 7, 1930) was a surrogate court judge and a member of both houses of the New York State Legislature.

Biography
He was born in 1871 and graduated from the New York Law School in 1894 and was allowed to the bar in the same year. He married Anna Alice Mitchel on December 27, 1898, and they had at least one son.

He was a member of the New York State Assembly (New York Co., 34th D.) in 1907 and 1908; and of the New York State Senate (22nd D.) in 1909 and 1910.

References

1871 births
1930 deaths
Democratic Party New York (state) state senators
Democratic Party members of the New York State Assembly
People from the Bronx
New York (state) state court judges